Eugene "Jug" Ammons (April 14, 1925 – August 6, 1974), also known as "The Boss", was an American jazz tenor saxophonist. The son of boogie-woogie pianist Albert Ammons, Gene Ammons is remembered for his accessible music, steeped in soul and R&B.

Biography
Born in Chicago, Illinois, Ammons studied music with instructor Walter Dyett at DuSable High School. Ammons began to gain recognition while still at high school when in 1943, at the age of 18, he went on the road with trumpeter King Kolax's band. In 1944, he joined the band of Billy Eckstine (who bestowed on him the nickname "Jug" when straw hats ordered for the band did not fit), playing alongside Charlie Parker and later Dexter Gordon. Performances from this period include "Blowin' the Blues Away," featuring a saxophone duel between Ammons and Gordon. After 1947, when Eckstine became a solo performer, Ammons then led a group, including Miles Davis and Sonny Stitt, that performed at Chicago's Jumptown Club. In 1949, Ammons replaced Stan Getz as a member of Woody Herman's Second Herd, and then in 1950 formed a duet with Sonny Stitt.

The 1950s were a prolific period for Ammons and produced some acclaimed recordings such as The Happy Blues (1956). Musicians who played in his groups, apart from Stitt, included Donald Byrd, Jackie McLean, John Coltrane, Kenny Burrell, Mal Waldron, Art Farmer, and Duke Jordan.

His later career was interrupted by two prison sentences for narcotics possession, the first from 1958 to 1960, the second from 1962 to 1969. He recorded as a leader for Mercury (1947–1949), Aristocrat (1948–1950), Chess (1950–1951), Prestige (1950–1952), Decca (1952), and United (1952–1953). For the rest of his career, he was affiliated with Prestige. After his release from prison in 1969, having served a seven-year sentence at Joliet penitentiary, he signed the largest contract ever offered at that time by Prestige's Bob Weinstock.

Ammons had the first of two records released by Leonard Chess on the newly-formed Chess Records label in 1950, titled "My Foolish Heart" (Chess 1425); Muddy Waters was the second record, "Rolling Stone" (Chess 1426).  Both records were released simultaneously.

Ammons died in Chicago on August 6, 1974, at the age of 49, from bone cancer. He was buried at Lincoln Cemetery in Blue Island, Illinois.

Playing style
Ammons and Von Freeman were the founders of the Chicago school of tenor saxophone. Ammons's style of playing showed influences from Lester Young as well as Ben Webster. These artists had helped develop the sound of the tenor saxophone to higher levels of expressiveness. Ammons, together with Dexter Gordon and Sonny Stitt, helped integrate their developments with the emerging "vernacular" of the bebop movement, and the chromaticism and rhythmic variety of Charlie Parker is evident in his playing.

While adept at the technical aspects of bebop, in particular its love of harmonic substitutions, Ammons stayed in touch with the commercial blues and R&B of his day. For example, in 1950 the saxophonist's recording of "My Foolish Heart" made Billboard Magazine's black pop charts. The soul jazz movement of the mid-1960s, often using the combination of tenor saxophone and Hammond B3 electric organ, counts him as a founder. With a thicker, warmer tone than Stitt or Gordon, Ammons could at will exploit a vast range of textures on the instrument, vocalizing it in ways that anticipated later artists such as Stanley Turrentine, Houston Person, and even Archie Shepp. Ammons showed little interest, however, in the modal jazz of John Coltrane, Joe Henderson or Wayne Shorter that was emerging at the same time.

Discography

As leader 
 All Star Sessions (Prestige, 1956) – recorded in 1955
 The Happy Blues (Prestige, 1956)
 Jammin' with Gene (Prestige, 1956)
 Jammin' in Hi Fi with Gene Ammons (Prestige, 1957)
 Funky (Prestige, 1957)
 Blue Gene (Prestige, 1958)
 The Big Sound  (Prestige, 1958)
 Soulful Saxophone (Chess, 1959) – compilation
 Boss Tenor (Prestige, 1960)
 Groove Blues (Prestige, 1961)
 Nice an' Cool (Moodsville, 1961)
 Jug (Prestige, 1961)
 Up Tight! (Prestige, 1961)
 Twisting the Jug with Joe Newman, Jack McDuff (Prestige, 1961)
 Bad! Bossa Nova (Prestige, 1962)
 Ca' Purange (Prestige, 1962)
 Just Jug (Argo, 1962)
 Preachin' (Prestige, 1963)
 Soul Summit Vol. 2 with Etta Jones, Jack McDuff (Prestige, 1963)
 The Soulful Moods of Gene Ammons (Moodsville, 1963)
 Velvet Soul (Prestige, 1964)
 Late Hour Special (Prestige, 1964)
 Angel Eyes (Prestige, 1965)
 Boss Soul! (Prestige, 1966)
 The Boss Is Back! (Prestige, 1969)
 Brother Jug! (Prestige, 1970)
 The Chase! with Dexter Gordon (Prestige, 1971)
 My Way  (Prestige, 1971)
 The Black Cat! (Prestige, 1971)
 Jug & Dodo with Dodo Marmarosa (Prestige, 1972)
 Free Again (Prestige, 1972)
 Got My Own (Prestige, 1973)
 Chicago Concert with James Moody (Prestige, 1973)
 Gene Ammons and Friends at Montreux (Prestige, 1973)
 Big Bad Jug (Prestige, 1973)
 Brasswind (Prestige, 1974)
 Goodbye (Prestige, 1975)
 Swinging the Jugg (Roots, 1976)
 Gene Ammons in Sweden (ENJA Records, 1981)
 Blue Groove (Prestige, 1982)
 Night Lights (Prestige, 1985)

With Sonny Stitt 
 Kaleidoscope (Prestige, 1957) – compilation
 Boss Tenors in Orbit! (Verve, 1962)
 Boss Tenors: Straight Ahead from Chicago August 1961 (Verve, 1962)
 Dig Him! (Argo, 1962) – reissued as We'll Be Together Again (Prestige, 1968)
 Soul Summit (Prestige, 1962)
 You Talk That Talk! (Prestige, 1971)
 Together Again for the Last Time (Prestige, 1976) – recorded in 1973

As sideman 
With Bennie Green
 Soul Stirrin' (Blue Note, 1958)
 The Swingin'est (Vee Jay, 1959)

With Richard "Groove" Holmes
 Groovin' with Jug (Pacific Jazz, 1961)
 Tell It Like It Is (Pacific Jazz, 1966)

With Jack McDuff
 Brother Jack Meets the Boss (Prestige, 1962)
 Rock Candy (Prestige, 1972) – compilation

With others
 David Axelrod, Heavy Axe (Fantasy, 1974)
 Richard B. Boone, I've Got a Right to Sing (Nocturne, 1968)
 Miles Davis, Bopping the Blues (Black Lion, 1987)
 Billy Eckstine, Maggie: The Savoy Sessions (Savoy, 1995) – recorded in 1947
 Howard McGhee, House Warmin'! (Argo, 1963) – originally issued in 1962 on Winley Records as Nothin' But Soul under Gene Ammons' name. 
 Charles Mingus, Charles Mingus and Friends in Concert (Columbia, 1973)
 Andrew White, Red Top (Andrew's Music, 1977)

References

External links

Online 78 RPM Discographical Project - Aristocrat

1925 births
1974 deaths
Bebop saxophonists
Hard bop saxophonists
Soul-jazz saxophonists
American jazz tenor saxophonists
American male saxophonists
African-American woodwind musicians
African-American saxophonists
Argo Records artists
Chess Records artists
Savoy Records artists
United Records artists
Prestige Records artists
Transatlantic Records artists
Deaths from cancer in Illinois
20th-century American saxophonists
20th-century American male musicians
American male jazz musicians
Deaths from bone cancer
20th-century African-American musicians